Sycon faulkneri is a species of calcareous sponge belonging to the family Sycettidae.

This is a small tubular sponge (less than 1 cm) found on soft substrates in deep waters in the Eastern Mediterranean Sea. Despite its recent discovery, this appears to be a common species, distinctive from other Mediterranean Sycon by its small size and habitat.

References

Leucosolenida
Animals described in 2003